Eduardo Sánchez Junco (April 26, 1943 – July 14, 2010) spent his childhood in Barcelona, where his father, Antonio Sánchez Gómez (1911–1984), was the editor of newspaper La Prensa. It was there, in their living room at home, that Eduardo's father and mother, Mercedes Junco Calderón (1920–2019), came up with the idea of a magazine showing life at its most beautiful, through reporting that would be both respectful and truthful. And so, on September 8, 1944, ¡Hola! was born. Since then, it has become a publishing empire in a class of its own.

Eduardo, just a year old when the magazine was launched, grew up surrounded by the tools of the trade, but his own interests focussed at first not on publishing, but on nature. He studied agricultural engineering. But while he always maintained a strong interest in this subject, he also felt drawn to his parents’ profession, and joined his father at work on ¡Hola!, by then already a household name.

Following his father's death in 1984, Eduardo took over the helm of the business. He chose to do so in the most hands-on way, as a journalist. While bringing up their three children –  daughters Mamen and Cheleles, and son Eduardo – he and his wife, Mamen Pérez Villota, together studied for degrees in journalism.

Eduardo, a media visionary, then embarked on a new stage of his company's expansion, propelling it onto the international stage. He launched Hello! magazine, which, like ¡HOLA!, marked a true departure, being the first magazine of its kind in Britain.

By the end of his career Eduardo had become a publishing legend. Thanks to him, ¡HOLA! exists in no less than 14 different national editions across the world. As well as Spain and Britain, 12 more countries belong to the ¡HOLA! family: Russia, Turkey, Thailand, Dubai, Greece, Morocco, Canada, India, Malaysia, Mexico, Serbia and Brazil. Published in ten different languages, the magazine is exported to a total of 70 countries, where it is read by 12 million people each week, making it one of the most-read publications in the world. Then there are the online editions, hola.com – the leading women's-interest internet portal, with 60 million page hits per month – and its English-language version, hellomagazine.com.

Eduardo was recognised with numerous prizes (see below). Among them are the European Forum's Gold Medal, the Gold Medal from the Queen Sofia Spanish Institute in New York and the Luca de Tena prize, presented to him by the King of Spain, as well as the International Press Directory's International Publishing Award.

To understand Eduardo the media magnate one had to understand Eduardo the man. He thought of his company as an extension of his family, and in fact all three of his children, as well as his mother and his wife, play key editorial roles. This guarantees the continued success of a title which has already made history.

Along with his charismatic personality, Eduardo's publishing philosophy was responsible for his extraordinary achievements. He knew to perfection what to offer his readers. He defined it as "the froth of life, nothing dense, nothing heavy. Not claiming to be anything more than entertainment, but always tasteful and discreet, never harmful nor judgmental, and never descending to gossip. A kind magazine, full of human interest."

Notes
Spanish language prizes
English language prizes

References

1943 births
2010 deaths
Spanish magazine publishers (people)